Mario Nicolás Almada (born 20 May 1975 in Buenos Aires) is a field hockey forward from Argentina.

Almada made his debut for the national squad in 1994, and competed in the 2000 Summer Olympics and the 2004 Summer Olympics. He has also been involved in coaching for the national team.

He has played club hockey in Spain with Club de Campo and Real Club de Polo de Barcelona; in the Netherlands for Laren; and in India in the Premier Hockey League for Orissa Steelers and then in the World Series Hockey for Pune Strykers.

References

External links

1975 births
Living people
Argentine people of Portuguese descent
Argentine male field hockey players
Male field hockey forwards
Olympic field hockey players of Argentina
Field hockey players from Buenos Aires
Field hockey players at the 2000 Summer Olympics
2002 Men's Hockey World Cup players
Field hockey players at the 2004 Summer Olympics
2006 Men's Hockey World Cup players
Field hockey players at the 2007 Pan American Games
2010 Men's Hockey World Cup players
World Series Hockey players
Pan American Games gold medalists for Argentina
Pan American Games silver medalists for Argentina
Pan American Games medalists in field hockey
Club de Campo Villa de Madrid players
Real Club de Polo de Barcelona players
Medalists at the 2007 Pan American Games
21st-century Argentine people